H. nigra may refer to:
 Hoplocorypha nigra, a praying mantis species found in the region of the Congo River
 Hopea nigra, a plant species

See also
 Nigra (disambiguation)